The St. Johns-Indian River Barge Canal was a planned canal in the state of Florida,  in length and linking the Intracoastal Waterway and the Indian River  south of Oak Hill with the St. Johns River, originally intended to be just south of Lake Harney, but later shifted to be near Lake Monroe, with all but three miles of the route within Volusia County. However, by 1968 the more southerly Lake Harney alignment had returned to favor.

Originally proposed in the 1850s, then again in 1909 and in the late 1930s, the St. Johns-Indian River Canal Authority was established in 1960.

Combined with the Cross Florida Barge Canal, the canal would have provided a shipping route across the Florida peninsula between the Atlantic Ocean and the Gulf of Mexico; construction was planned to begin in 1968, with the canal to open in 1971, however construction never began as delays to the Cross Florida Barge Canal project mounted, with the projected groundbreaking pushed back first to 1970, then further, with conservation issues dogging the project especially with regard to spawning shad.

After the suspension of work on the Cross Florida Barge Canal, the St. Johns-Indian River canal concept was abandoned, and the Canal Authority was dissolved in 1973.

References

Canals in Florida
Transportation buildings and structures in Volusia County, Florida
Transportation buildings and structures in Brevard County, Florida
Transportation buildings and structures in Seminole County, Florida
History of transportation in Florida